San Martino Dall'argine is a comune (municipality) in the Province of Mantua in the Italian region Lombardy, located about  southeast of Milan and about  southwest of Mantua.

Notable people
Ferrante Aporti
Achille Graffigna

References

External links
 Official website

Cities and towns in Lombardy